The Kalinin K-12 was a proof-of-concept aircraft developed by the Kalinin Design Bureau in the 1930s.

Design and development
The K-12 was intended as a tailless bomber aircraft. Also called the Kalinin BS-2 or the Zhar-Ptitsa ("Firebird"), it featured welded steel-tube construction with fabric covering, as well as a dummy nose and tail turrets. The K-12 was painted in a garish colour scheme representing a bird. A subscale glider to test the K-12's features flew in 1934, piloted by V.O. Borisov. The K-12 flew in autumn 1936 and was demonstrated at Tushino in August 1937. The full-size K-12, however, was cancelled after Konstantin Kalinin was arrested and executed as an enemy of the state.

Specifications

References

Further reading
 В. Б. Шавров: История конструкций самолетов в СССР до 1938. S. 416.

1920s Soviet and Russian airliners
Kalinin aircraft